The Men's freestyle 70 kg is a competition featured at the 2017 European Wrestling Championships, and was held in Novi Sad, Serbia on May 5.

Medalists

Results
Legend
F — Won by fall

Final

Top half

Section 1

Bottom half

Repechage

References
Draw
Results

Men's freestyle 70 kg